Underground is a 1970 American drama film directed by Arthur H. Nadel, written by Ron A. Bishop and Andy Lewis, and starring Robert Goulet, Danielle Gaubert, Lawrence Dobkin, Carl Duering, Joachim Hansen and Roger Delgado. It was released on October 7, 1970, by United Artists.

Production
Many of the scenes set in England were actually filmed in the Republic of Ireland, in the town of Enniscorthy. Buildings seen in the film included St Aidan's Cathedral, Enniscorthy railway station, Lett's Brewery, Abbey Square and the rowing club boathouse.

Plot
During World War II, an American intelligence agent in England, ashamed for having yielded information to the Germans during a previous capture, attempts to redeem himself by contriving his way into a French resistance group, with his ultimate plan being to kidnap a valuable German general and obtain his secrets.

Cast
Robert Goulet as Dawson
Danielle Gaubert as Yvonne
Lawrence Dobkin as Boule
Carl Duering as General Stryker
Joachim Hansen as Major Hessler
Roger Delgado as Xavier
Alexander Peleg as Moravin
George Pravda as Menk
Leon Lissek as Sergeant
Harry Brooks Jr. as Panzer Sergeant
Sebastian Breaks as Condon
Nicole Croisille as Bistro Singer
Derry Power as Pommard
Paul Murphy as Jean
Gerry Sullivan as Fosse
Eamonn Keane as Emile
Andre Charisse as Gerrard
Andreas Malandrinos as Jacquard 
Liam O'Callaghan as Imhoff
David Leland as Paul
Robert Vincent Smith as Sentry
Martin Crosbie as RAF Sergeant
Jim Bartley as First Maquis
Gerry Alexander as Second Maquis
Chris O'Neill as Aid Man
Bill Golding as German Staff Sergeant
Fred Meany as Enlisted Man
Stephen Follett as Boy in Church
Maura Keeley as Mother
Frank Hayden as Motorcycle Lieutenant
Bob Carlile as Corporal
Conor Evans as German Officer in Church
Brendan Matthews as German Officer
Joe Pilkington as Enlisted Man
Barry Cowan as First Radarman
Jeremy Jones as Second Radarman

See also
List of American films of 1970

References

External links
 

1970 films
United Artists films
American war drama films
British war drama films
1970 drama films
American World War II films
British World War II films
World War II films based on actual events
Films about the French Resistance
Films scored by Stanley Myers
Films shot in County Wexford
1970s English-language films
1970s American films